Come Get Some may refer to:

 "Come Get Some" (Rooster song), 2005
 "Come Get Some" (TLC song), 2002
 Come Get Some (EP), 1996 EP by the Gamits